Leeds Festival Fringe is a 7-day grassroots music festival held across several music venues in Leeds in the week prior to Leeds and Reading Festival. It was created in 2010 to showcase local talent before the main festival hits town.

Throughout the week, local promoters, bands, fanzines and on-line music communities all have their "takeover" of Leeds Festival Fringe thus bringing everyone who works all year round to benefit the local music scene together under one banner during one week.

The first year was very successful with over 120 performances, over 400 musicians playing in one week.

2010
The 2010 event took place between 19 and 25 August.

Venues
 Carpe Diem
 The Well
 The New Conservatory
 Royal Park Cellars
 The Elbow Room
 The Dry Dock
 The Hop and The Northern Monkey.

Hosts
 All Sorted Records
 The Beat Surrender
 Broken Heart Underground
 Bootscraper
 Claire Cameron Band
 Grain Division
 Hound Dog Promotions
 Liverpool Bands and Friends
 Lyrically Justified
 The Red Pills
 The Rhubarb Bomb
 Yorkshire Music Collective and Yorkshire Underground Band Show.

Artists

 Acid Drop
 Acoustic Jim
 Adam Findlay
 Adelaide Harlequin
 A Last Concern
 Alvin Purple
 Angry Vs The Bear
 Audit Control
 Beat The Red Light
 The Beau's
 Belleville
 Ben Peel
 Beretta Suicide
 Bernadette Dales
 Black Diamond Bay (UK)
 Black Water
 The Blind Dead McJones Band
 Bludger
 Bootscraper
 Caesar Stars
 The Captives
 China Shop Bull
 Chris Martin
 Chris Sharp
 Claire Cameron Band
 Claw of Panther
 Codego
 Confined Within
 Cotheria
 Cupboard Wolves
 Danny Gruff
 Diamond Dac Charnley
 The Dirty Jeans
 Down The Machine
 Egypsy
 4 Day Weekend
 El Camino
 Elephants on Acid
 The Famous Class
 The Freewheel
 Faux Romantics
 Fight The Frontline
 For The Ride
 The Fuzz
 Gaia
 Gentle Breeze
 Gerry Cooper
 Ghosts In The Nightclub
 Giraffey Fantastic
 Hemingway
 The Idles
 IMP
 The Insight
 Jack and Gill's Daughter
 Jasmine Kennedy
 The Jaw-Line of Julianne Moore
 JB Butterfield

 Jen Armstrong Music
 Johnny Powell
 Jonny The Firth
 Kath and The Mighty Menace
 Lifescreen
 Lou Gibbs
 Louise Distras
 Luva Gunk
 Man Get Out
 March of the Defiants
 Matt Bentley
 The Melodicas New Reed
 Merry-Go
 Mi Mye
 Miranda versus The Crok
 Mondo Cane
 Montauk Island
 The Moves
 Mr Gary C
 Mutiny For Hire
 New York Alcoholic Anxiety Attack
 Old Man Pie
 Pastel Jack
 Philip Cockerham
 Quiet Rebellion
 Radio Gypsy
 The Red Pills
 Redstar
 Revenge of The Psychotronic Man
 Road To Horizon
 Runaround Kids
 Scott Anthony Wainwright
 Secret Circuits
 Secrets of Kaplan
 Silverlode
 The Shrinks
 The Sickmen of Europe
 The Sighting
 Spiders Eat Vinyl
 The Spills
 S.S.S.S.S.
 Standard Fare
 State of Error
 The Stella Frays
 Steph Stephenson
 The Swindells
 The Tabbs
 Tag-Team Preacher
 The Temps
 The Tender Hooligans
 13 Lights
 Time of Hibu
 Volcanoes
 We Run Riot
 We Say No
 The Wick Effect
 X-Ray Cat Trio

2011
The 2011 event took place between 18 and 24 August.

Venues
 Carpe Diem
 The New Conservatory
 Milo
 Empire
 The Dry Dock
 The Well
 The Northern Monkey
 The Ship
 The Grove
 Baby Jupiter

Hosts
 All Sorted Records
 Bad Brains
 The Beat Surrender
 Bootscraper
 Grain Division
 Hound Dog Promotions
 I 'heart' Indie
 Lyrically Justified
 Metal Fringe
 Northern Torch
 The Red Pills
 Yorkshire Music Collective

Artists

 AB Negative
 A Day For Heroes
 A Kick Inside
 Alice Ostapjuk
 Anna Fur Laxis
 Anita Maj
 Arizona Bay
 The Artists
 Ashe Vendetta
 Ashwin Thomas
 Banditos
 Bang Bang Romeo
 Ben Peel & The Wool City Folk Club
 The Big I Am
 The Blind Dead McJones Band
 Bludger
 The Boneyard
 Bootscraper
 British Racing Green
 Catfish and the Bottlemen
 Cats for Peru
 Chasing Dragons
 Chris Martin
 Claire Cameron Band
 The Coopers
 Crysis
 The Dangerous Aces
 Dan Burnett
 The Dawnriders
 Deadwall
 Deep In The Mire
 Diamond Dac
 Charnley
 Dirty Fakirs
 Disco Machine Gun
 DJ Ryan Carter
 Down The Machine
 Dr. Sketchy
 Echo Town
 Eclectic Sparks
 Eden
 Every Dying Moment
 Fade Away
 4 Letter Holiday
 Further From The Truth
 Gerry Cooper
 The Guilt Charm
 Hail To The Eskimo
 Happy Red Tractors
 The Idol Dead
 Idiot Box
 I Said The Spy
 Izzy Thomas
 Jack's Attic
 John Parkes
 Jumping Ships
 Karma Slave

 Katy Haymer
 King Headlock
 Leeds Burlesque
 Leesa Mae
 LeeSun
 Little Black Hearts
 Louise Distras
 Marsicans
 Matt Bentley
 Medicine Bow
 The Mexanines
 Michelle Nadia
 Middleman
 Miranda vs. The Crok
 Mishkin*The Mo-Mos
 Mr. Gary C
 Neve
 NGOD
 Northern Torch
 Ols Moore & The Gypsy Dogs
 One Stop Railway
 The Paper Smiles
 The Peppermint Hunting Lodge
 Penguin
 Pocket of 3
 Project Metropolis
 Propane Penny
 PseudoNympho
 Raw Peaches
 The Red Pills
 Redwire
 Road To Horizon
 Rupert Stroud
 Ryan Mitchell-Smith
 Ryder
 Scott Wainwright
 Seas of Green
 Sebastopher
 Sharp Darts
 Silverlode
 16-Bit Revival
 Skint and Demoralised
 Spiders
 Steph Stephenson
 Stolen Peace
 The Soul Circle Gang
 So What Robot
 Sunday For The Suspect
 The Swindells
 TestTone3
 Ti Amo
 Tomorrow We Radio
 Town Street Seamonster
 Two Sevens
 Two Trick Horse

References 
Leeds Festival Fringe Website

External links

 Fringe Benefits by The Unsigned Guide
 Leeds Festival Fringe is a First - BBC Leeds
 Leeds Festival Fringe starts today - The Guardian
 Leeds Festival Fringe Preview - Yorkshire Evening Post
 Leeds Fests Little Brother by Leeds Uncut
 Leeds Fringe Rocks The City

Music festivals in Leeds